Anže Kopitar (born 24 August 1987) is a Slovene professional ice hockey centre and captain of the Los Angeles Kings of the National Hockey League (NHL). The 11th overall pick in the 2005 NHL Entry Draft, Kopitar became the first Slovene to play in the NHL upon making his debut in 2006. Kopitar has spent his entire NHL career with the Kings, has led the team in scoring in all but two seasons and is fourth in franchise history in points, goals, and assists, scoring his 1,000th career point in 2021. Following the 2015–16 season, he was named the Kings' captain. Noted for both his offensive and defensive play, Kopitar was awarded the Frank J. Selke Trophy as the best defensive forward in the NHL in 2016, as well as the Lady Byng Memorial Trophy for gentlemanly play the same year. He won the Selke Trophy for a second time in 2018.

Kopitar played junior hockey for his hometown team HK Acroni Jesenice before moving to Sweden at age 16 to play in a more competitive league. He spent one season with the junior teams of the Södertälje SK organization, and then with the senior team of the top-level Elitserien. He moved to North America to join the Kings in 2006, one year after he was drafted, and finished fourth in the Calder Memorial Trophy voting for the league's top rookie. Kopitar's offensive talent was immediately apparent when he joined the Kings, though his defensive style developed in later seasons and he has become recognized for his two-way play, being a finalist for the Selke Trophy three times, winning twice. In 2018 he was a finalist for the Hart Memorial Trophy. Praised as one of the best players in the League, Kopitar won the Stanley Cup with the Kings in 2012 and 2014, leading the playoffs in points on both occasions (tied with teammate Dustin Brown in 2012). Internationally, Kopitar has represented the Slovenian national team in several junior and senior tournaments, as well as at the 2014 Winter Olympics in Sochi. He also played for Team Europe at the 2016 World Cup of Hockey.

Playing career

European career (2002–2006)
In 2002, Kopitar began playing for the youth team of his hometown, HK Acroni Jesenice. He split the year between the team's under-18 and junior clubs, and also appeared in 11 games for the senior team HK Kranjska Gora of the Slovenian Ice Hockey League. Kopitar had four goals and four assists in the senior league, and recorded 76 points in 14 games for the Jesenice under-18 team and 27 points in 20 games for the junior club. He led the Slovenian Ice Hockey League in scoring at the age of 16, and Swedish scout Lars Söder recruited Kopitar for the Elitserien in 2004 (Söder had originally discovered Kopitar when he was 13 at the 2001 European Youth Olympic Winter Festival in Vuokatti, Finland).

The Slovenian Ice Hockey League did not have a high enough skill level, so Kopitar decided that if he wanted to improve his career prospects, he would have to leave the country. He was offered a chance to play in Sweden for Södertälje SK, eventually joining their junior team where he led the League in scoring, with 49 points (28 goals, 21 assists) in 30 games. At 17, prior to the 2005 NHL Entry Draft, Kopitar was ranked the top European skater by the NHL Central Scouting Bureau. After his first season in Sweden, he was chosen 11th overall by the Los Angeles Kings in the 2005 Draft. Unlike most top-ranked prospects, Kopitar was not at the draft, but in Sweden playing in preseason games. Some members of the team had a party for the draft, including Niclas Bergfors, who was selected 23rd overall by the New Jersey Devils. Prior to the NHL Draft, Kopitar was also selected in the CHL Import Draft by the Regina Pats of the Western Hockey League (WHL). At 18 years of age, he declined to move to North America, however, hoping to further his development by continuing to play against professionals in the Elitserien, rather than against major junior players in the WHL.

Los Angeles Kings (2006–present)
Kopitar signed an entry-level contract with the Kings on 7 September 2005, but returned to play in Sweden for another season. The next year, 2006, he accepted an invitation to Los Angeles' rookie camp. He made his NHL debut on 6 October 2006, against the Anaheim Ducks and scored two goals in the game. In January 2007, he was named to the NHL YoungStars Game, an event included at the All-Star Game festivities; Kopitar recorded two goals and three assists. Kopitar completed his first NHL season third among rookies in scoring, behind Evgeni Malkin and Paul Šťastný, with 20 goals and 41 assists for 61 points. It marked the fifth-highest point total by a Kings rookie, and the highest since Luc Robitaille in 1986–87. He finished fourth in voting for the Calder Memorial Trophy as rookie of the year. Kopitar was awarded the Mark Bavis Memorial Award as the best first-year member of the Kings and was also named the Kings' Most Popular Player.

The following season, 2007–08, Kopitar was selected to represent the Western Conference at the 56th NHL All-Star Game in Atlanta, his first all-star game appearance. He was the youngest player in the game, nearly two years younger than the second-youngest player, Paul Stastny (Sidney Crosby was younger, but had to withdraw prior to the game due to injury). Kopitar finished the regular season with 32 goals and 45 assists for 77 points; he led the Kings in assists and points and was second in goals. Kopitar won the Bill Libby Memorial Award as the most valuable player on the Kings.

Early in the 2008–09 season, on 11 October 2008, Kopitar signed a seven-year contract extension with the Kings worth $47.6 million. The contract would keep Kopitar with the team until the conclusion of the 2015–16 season. He finished the season with 66 points in 82 games, leading the Kings in both assists and points, while again finishing second in goals scored. The following season, Kopitar scored his first career NHL hat-trick (3 goals in one game) on 22 October 2009 against the Dallas Stars. He finished the 2009–10 season with a career-high 34 goals and 81 points. For the second time in his career, Kopitar won the Bill Libby Memorial Award as the Kings' most valuable player, and led the team in scoring for the third-straight year. Kopitar made his Stanley Cup playoff debut that season, as the Kings qualified for the postseason for the first time since 2002. The Kings lost in the Western Conference Quarterfinals to the Vancouver Canucks, and Kopitar finished tied for third on the team with five points in six games.

The 2010–11 season saw Kopitar play in his 325th consecutive NHL game, which set a new Kings team record, passing Marcel Dionne on 15 March 2011. However eleven days later, Kopitar's season and ironman streak came to an abrupt end at 330 games after he suffered a broken ankle. Despite the injury setback, Kopitar led the team in scoring for the fourth straight season with 73 points, and was named the team's most valuable player for the second time. 

In the 2011–12 season, Kopitar led the Kings in scoring with 76 points, including a career-best 51 assists. The Kings won the Stanley Cup as playoff champions, their first title in team history. Kopitar finished tied with Kings captain Dustin Brown to lead the team in playoff scoring, with each having 20 points from 20 games played. Kopitar became the first Slovenian-born player to win the Stanley Cup. In recognition of this, Kopitar was named as the 2012 Slovenian male Athlete of the Year.

The 2012–13 NHL season was delayed due to the NHL lockout, so Kopitar joined his younger brother Gašper on Mora IK of the Swedish second-tier league HockeyAllsvenskan, signing a contract with the team for the 2012–13 season. He played 31 games for Mora, scoring 34 points, before the NHL lockout ended in January 2013. A shortened, 48-game NHL season commenced, Kopitar recorded 42 points in 47 games to once again lead the Kings in scoring, and was named the team's best defensive player.

The 2013–14 season saw Kopitar lead the team in scoring for the seventh consecutive season, with 70 points, and was named both the team's most valuable player and best defensive player. He also was a finalist for the Frank J. Selke Trophy as best defensive forward in the NHL for the first time. In the playoffs, Kopitar led the entire league in scoring, recording 26 points in 26 games, as the Kings won their second Stanley Cup championship. 

The next season saw Kopitar tie Marcel Dionne as the only player in Kings history to lead the team in scoring eight times, having scored 16 goals and 48 assists for 64 points. Kopitar was a finalist for the Selke Trophy again, and also for the Lady Byng Memorial Trophy, awarded for sportsmanship. During the 2015–16 season Kopitar signed an eight-year contract extension with the Kings. It would pay him an average of $10 million per season until the end of the 2023–24 season. He finished the season with 74 points, setting a team record by leading the Kings in scoring for a ninth consecutive season. Kopitar also was awarded both the Lady Byng and Frank J. Selke Trophies, the first player from the Kings to win either award. He also won the Bill Libby Memorial Award as the most valuable player on the Kings for the fifth time. 

On 16 June 2016, Kopitar was named the captain of the Kings, replacing Dustin Brown. In his first season as captain of the Kings, Kopitar saw his production drop, and he finished with 52 points, second on the team behind Jeff Carter, and ending his nine-year streak of leading the team in scoring. Kopitar returned to form in the 2017–18 season scoring a career-high 35 goals and 57 assists for 92 points, helping the Kings get back to the playoffs. He scored his fourth career hat-trick with four goals on 22 March 2018, against the Colorado Avalanche. After the season, Kopitar was a finalist for the Hart Memorial Trophy and was awarded the Frank J. Selke Trophy for the second time in his career.

The following season, on 1 April 2019, in a game against the Calgary Flames, Kopitar played his 1,000th NHL game.

On 5 May 2021, Kopitar recorded his 1,000th career point, becoming the 91st player to reach the mark.

On 14 October 2021, Kopitar scored 3 goals and 2 assists against the Vegas Golden Knights, setting a franchise record for most points in a home opening game. However, Kopitar missed the 20-goal mark for the first time since the 2016–17 season (excluding the shortened 2020–21 season). He recorded his 700th career assist in the Kings' final home game of the season on 23 April 2022, a 4–2 win against the Anaheim Ducks. He was awarded the Mark Messier Leadership Award at season's end, becoming the second Kings player to win it after teammate Dustin Brown.

Kopitar recorded his sixth career hat-trick on 28 February 2023, scoring four goals in a 6–5 shootout victory against the Winnipeg Jets.

International play

Kopitar first played in an international tournament when he participated in the Division I (second level) tournament of the 2003 IIHF World U18 Championships for the Slovenian national junior team. He appeared in five games and recorded three points. The following year he appeared in the 2004 U18 tournament and the 2004 World Junior Championships. Slovenia competed in Division I at both tournaments, one level below the top division. Kopitar scored six goals and eight points in five games during the under-18 tournament and finished second overall for goals scored and third for points, leading Slovenia in both categories; at the World Juniors he had one goal and one assist in five games.

In 2005 Kopitar appeared in three international tournaments for Slovenia; he took part in the U18 Championship, World Juniors, and the senior World Championship, his first tournament with the Slovenian national team. Slovenia competed at the Division I level for both junior tournaments, but at the top level for the senior championship. He would play his last junior tournament in 2006 at the Division I level, with six points in five games. At the 2006 World Championship he played for Slovenia at the top level and recorded three goals and nine points in six games, tying for fifth among scoring leaders. Slovenia was relegated to Division I for 2007, where Kopitar had 13 assists and 14 points, leading the tournament in both categories. Back in the top division for the 2008 IIHF World Championship, Kopitar appeared in five games and had four points to lead his team, though Slovenia was once again relegated.

Slovenia qualified for the 2014 Winter Olympics in Sochi; as the qualifying games were held during the NHL season Kopitar was unable to participate, though his father Matjaž coached the team and Gašper played in the matches. Though Gašper was part of the team that secured qualification for Slovenia, he was not named to the Olympic roster. Kopitar helped Slovenia reach the quarterfinals of the tournament by scoring two goals and one assist.

Kopitar was also named to play in the 2016 World Cup of Hockey for Team Europe, which includes players from most of Europe (the Czech Republic, Finland, Russia, and Sweden have their own teams). Prior to the announcement Kopitar had expressed excitement towards the concept, which was to be introduced during the tournament, noting that as a Slovenian he had few opportunities to play in tournaments like this.

Playing style

Kopitar is known in the NHL as one of the most effective two-way forwards, excelling in both offence and defence, for which he has won the  Frank J. Selke Trophy in 2016 and 2018, after being a finalist for the award in both 2014 and 2015. Kopitar has one of the highest career averages for winning faceoffs, and has led the Kings in team scoring 14 times in his career.

Personal life
Kopitar was born in Jesenice, Slovenia (then part of Yugoslavia) to Matjaž and Mateja Kopitar. Matjaž played hockey for HK Acroni Jesenice, winning the league title three times, and was a member of the Yugoslav and Slovenian national teams. He also coached HK Acroni Jesenice of the Austrian Hockey League during the 2006–07 season and the Slovenian national team from 2010 until 2015. Mateja worked at the family restaurant in Hrušica, a village about five kilometres from Jesenice.

When Kopitar was four, his father first taught him how to skate; Matjaž built an ice rink in their backyard in Hrušica, and Kopitar would play there whenever he could. Kopitar has a brother, Gašper, who is five years younger. Gašper also plays hockey; when the Kopitar family moved to Los Angeles, Gašper joined a junior team sponsored by the Kings. He then played for the Portland Winterhawks of the major junior Western Hockey League (WHL) and the Des Moines Buccaneers of the United States Hockey League (USHL), before turning professional with Mora IK in Sweden. Kopitar's grandmother taught English at a local high school, and both Kopitar and his brother learned to speak English from her. Kopitar speaks five languages: Slovene, Serbian, German, Swedish, and English. He enjoys playing soccer and is a declared supporter of Slovenian soccer club NK Maribor.

Kopitar is renowned in Slovenia due to his hockey exploits, with a government-sponsored website declaring that after he won the Stanley Cup in 2012 he was "the most recognised Slovenian sportsman." As a youth, he played in the 2000 and 2001 Quebec International Pee-Wee Hockey Tournaments with a team from Slovenia. He also hosts an annual charity golf tournament that benefits various groups, mainly youths.

Kopitar lived with his parents until moving to Sweden, where he lived alone in an apartment. After his first season in the NHL, the rest of Kopitar's family joined him in Los Angeles; Kopitar bought a home in Manhattan Beach in 2014. Kopitar met Ines Dominc in Slovenia in 2005; they married in July 2013. Their first child, a daughter named Neža, was born on 14 March 2015. Their second child, son Jakob, was born 5 October 2016.

Career statistics

Regular season and playoffs
Bold indicates led league

International

YoungStar Games

All-Star Games

All statistics are taken from NHL.com.

Awards and honours

References

External links

 
 

1987 births
Living people
Ethnic Slovene people
Frank Selke Trophy winners
Ice hockey players at the 2014 Winter Olympics
Lady Byng Memorial Trophy winners
Los Angeles Kings draft picks
Los Angeles Kings players
Mora IK players
National Hockey League All-Stars
National Hockey League first-round draft picks
Olympic ice hockey players of Slovenia
Slovenian ice hockey centres
Södertälje SK players
Sportspeople from Jesenice, Jesenice
Stanley Cup champions
Slovenian expatriate ice hockey people
Slovenian expatriate sportspeople in the United States
Slovenian expatriate sportspeople in Sweden
Expatriate ice hockey players in Sweden
Expatriate ice hockey players in the United States